Gerald Francis Joseph Woodlock (1923 – January 2002) was a Canadian football player who played for the Edmonton Eskimos and Calgary Stampeders. He previously played junior football in Calgary.

References

1923 births
2002 deaths
Canadian football guards
Calgary Stampeders players
Edmonton Elks players